Geophis is a genus of snakes in the subfamily Dipsadinae of the family Colubridae of the superfamily Colubroidea. Species in the genus Geophis are commonly referred to as Latin American earth snakes (Spanish: culebra minera or culebra minadora). The genus consists of 53 distinct species.

Species
The following species are recognized as being valid.
Geophis annuliferus  – western snail-eating snake
Geophis anocularis  – Sierra Mije earth snake
Geophis bellus  
Geophis berillus 
Geophis betaniensis  – Betanien earth snake
Geophis bicolor  – Mexican plateau earth snake
Geophis blanchardi  – Blanchard's earth snake
Geophis brachycephalus  – Costa Rican earth snake
Geophis cancellatus  – Chiapas earth snake
Geophis cansecoi 
Geophis carinosus  – keeled earth snake
Geophis chalybeus  – Veracruz earth snake
Geophis championi   – Panamenian earth snake
Geophis damiani  	
Geophis downsi  – Down's earth snake, Savage's earth snake 
Geophis dubius  – Mesa del Sur earth snake	
Geophis duellmani  – Sierra Juarez earth snake
Geophis dugesii  – Dugès's earth snake		
Geophis dunni  – Dunn's earth snake
Geophis fulvoguttatus  – Mertens's earth snake	
Geophis godmani  – Godman's earth snake
Geophis hoffmanni  – Hoffmann's earth snake	
Geophis immaculatus  – Downs's earth snake
Geophis incomptus  – Sierra Coalcoman earth snake'	
Geophis isthmicus  – isthmian earth snake
Geophis juarezi  – Benito Juarez's earth snake
Geophis juliai 	– Zurtuche's earth snake
Geophis laticinctus  – Mesa Central earth snake	
Geophis laticollaris  – widecollar earth snake 	
Geophis latifrontalis  – Potosí earth snake	
Geophis lorancai 
Geophis maculiferus  – Michoacán earth snake
Geophis mutitorques  – highland earth snake
Geophis nasalis  – coffee earth snake
Geophis nephodrymus 	
Geophis nigroalbus  – Colombian earth snake	
Geophis nigrocinctus  – black-banded earth snake
Geophis occabus 	
Geophis omiltemanus  – Guerreran earth snake
Geophis petersii  – Peters's earth snake	
Geophis pyburni  – Pyburn's earth snake	
Geophis rhodogaster  – rosebelly earth snake	
Geophis rostralis  –Sierra Madre earth snake   		
Geophis ruthveni  – Ruthven's earth snake	
Geophis sallaei  – Sallae's earth snake
Geophis sanniolus  – pygmy snail sucker
Geophis sartorii  – terrestrial snail sucker
Geophis semidoliatus  – coral earth snake	
Geophis sieboldi  – Siebold's earth snake
Geophis talamancae 	
Geophis tarascae  – Tarascan earth snake
Geophis tectus 
Geophis turbidus 	
Geophis zeledoni 

Nota bene: A binomial authority in parentheses indicates that the species was originally described in a genus other than Geophis.

References

Further reading
Boulenger GA (1894). Catalogue of the Snakes in the British Museum (Natural History). Volume II., Containing the Conclusion of the Colubridæ Aglyphæ. London: Trustees of the British Museum (Natural History). (Taylor and Francis, printers). xi + 382 pp. + Plates I-XX. (Genus Geophis, pp. 314–315).
Freiberg M (1982). Snakes of South America. Hong Kong: T.F.H. Publications. 189 pp. . (Genus Geophis, pp. 69, 70, 98).
Wagler J (1830). Natürliches system der Amphibien, mit vorangehender Classification der Säugthiere und Vögel. Ein Beitrag zur vergleichenden Zoologie. Munich, Stuttgart and Tübingen: J.G. Cotta. vi + 354 pp. + one plate. (Geophis, new genus, p. 342). (in German and Latin).
Wilson JD, Townsend JH (2007). "A checklist and key to the snakes of the genus Geophis (Squamata: Colubridae: Dipsadinae), with commentary on distribution and conservation". Zootaxa 1395: 1–31.

Geophis
Snake genera
Taxa named by Johann Georg Wagler